Anna Eileen Heckart ( Herbert; March 29, 1919 – December 31, 2001) was an American stage and screen actress whose career spanned nearly 60 years.

Early life
Heckart was born Anna Eileen Herbert in Columbus, Ohio.  The daughter of Esther, who wed Leo Herbert (not the child's father) at her own mother's insistence so her child would not be born with the stigma of illegitimacy. Eileen was soon after legally adopted by her maternal grandmother's wealthy second husband, J.W. Heckart, the surname by which she would be known her entire life. She had two stepsisters, Anne and Marilyn. She graduated from Ohio State University with a B.A. in drama. She additionally studied drama at HB Studio in New York City.

Career

Stage
Heckart began her Broadway career as the assistant stage manager and an understudy for The Voice of the Turtle in 1943. Her many credits include Picnic, The Bad Seed, A View from the Bridge, A Memory of Two Mondays, The Dark at the Top of the Stairs, A Family Affair, And Things That Go Bump in the Night, Barefoot in the Park, Butterflies Are Free, You Know I Can't Hear You When the Water's Running, and The Cemetery Club.

Heckart won the 1953 Theatre World Award for Picnic. Her nominations include Tony Award nominations for Butterflies Are Free, Invitation to a March, and The Dark at the Top of the Stairs. 

In 2000, at age 81, she appeared off-Broadway in Kenneth Lonergan's The Waverly Gallery. For this performance, she won several awards, including the Drama Desk Award, the Lucille Lortel Award, the Drama League Award and the Outer Critics Circle Award. That same year, she was inducted into the American Theatre Hall of Fame and received an honorary Tony Award for lifetime achievement.

She was granted three honorary doctorates by Sacred Heart University, Niagara University, and Ohio State University.

Film and television

Heckart won the Academy Award for Best Supporting Actress for her work in the 1972 movie adaptation of Butterflies Are Free and was nominated in 1956 for her performance as the bereaved, besotted Mrs. Daigle in The Bad Seed (1956), both of which were roles Heckart originated on Broadway. Heckart appeared in the Hiding Place (1976) as a nurse working inside the concentration camp and later appeared as a Vietnam War widow in the Clint Eastwood film Heartbreak Ridge (1986). She played Diane Keaton's meddling mother in the 1996 comedy film The First Wives Club. 

On television, Heckart had starring roles in The Five Mrs. Buchanans, Out of the Blue, Partners in Crime, and Backstairs at the White House (Emmy nomination as Eleanor Roosevelt). In 1994, she won an Emmy Award for Outstanding Guest Actress in a Comedy Series for her appearance as Rose Stein on Love & War. In 1988, she appeared as Ruth in the Tales from the Darkside episode "Do Not Open This Box". Her other guest roles included The Fugitive (where she appeared in three episodes as a nun, "Sister Veronica"), The Mary Tyler Moore Show (two Emmy nominations as journalist Flo Meredith, a role she carried over to a guest appearance on MTM's spinoff Lou Grant), Love Story, Rhoda, Alice, Murder One, Hawaii Five-O, Gunsmoke, Cybill, The Cosby Show (one Emmy nomination as Mrs. Hickson), and many others.

She appeared on two episodes of Gunsmoke. In 1965, Heckart  appeared as Hattie Silks on the episode "The Lady." In 1969, Heckart appeared as Athena Partridge Royce on the episode "The Innocent".

Heckart played two unrelated characters on the daytime soap opera One Life to Live. During the 1980s, she played Ruth Perkins, the mother of Allison Perkins, who had kidnapped the newborn baby of heroine Viki Lord Buchanan under orders from phony evangelist and mastermind criminal Mitch Laurence. During the early 1990s, she played the role of Wilma Bern, mother of upstate Pennsylvania mob boss Carlo Hesser and his meek twin, Mortimer Bern. She appeared in the 1954 legal drama Justice, based on case files of New York's Legal Aid Society. She appeared in an episode of the medical drama The Eleventh Hour, titled "There Should Be an Outfit Called 'Families Anonymous!'" (1963), and an episode of Home Improvement, titled "Losing My Religion". She also played the role of Amanda Cooper on the Little House on the Prairie episode "Dance With Me".

Heckart has a star on the Hollywood Walk of Fame at 6162 Hollywood Blvd.

Personal life
In 1942, Heckart married insurance broker John Harrison Yankee, Jr., her college sweetheart. They had three sons. Her son Luke Yankee is the author of her 2006 biography Just Outside the Spotlight: Growing Up with Eileen Heckart.

Heckart was a Democrat. She met President Lyndon B. Johnson at The White House in 1967.

Heckart was an adherent of Roman Catholicism.

Death
On December 31, 2001, Heckart died of lung cancer at her home in Norwalk, Connecticut, at the age of 82. She was cremated with her ashes scattered outside the Music Box Theatre in Manhattan, New York.

Filmography

Awards and nominations

References

External links

 

1919 births
2001 deaths
American adoptees
American film actresses
American stage actresses
American television actresses
Best Supporting Actress Academy Award winners
Best Supporting Actress Golden Globe (film) winners
Bexley High School alumni
Deaths from cancer in Connecticut
Donaldson Award winners
Drama Desk Award winners
Primetime Emmy Award winners
Ohio State University College of Arts and Sciences alumni
Actresses from Columbus, Ohio
Actors from Norwalk, Connecticut
Deaths from lung cancer
20th-century American actresses
Connecticut Democrats
Ohio Democrats
New York (state) Democrats
California Democrats
American Roman Catholics